Savo Lazarević nicknamed Batara (1849 — 1943) was Montenegrin and Yugoslav military officer.

Family 
Lazarević was born in Lipovo. His father's name was Džajo. According to Ratko Parežanin, Lazarević had a son, Ljubo.

First Balkan War and First World War 
From 1912 to 1916, Lazarević was the commander of the Montenegrin gendarmerie in Metohija, whose members were known as the winged men because of the insignia they wore on their hats, which depicted an eagle with open wings. Those who were shot at by Lazarević nicknamed him Batara, which means 'salvo' in Albanian. According to some sources he subjected many Albanians from Metohija to forcible Christianization.

Lazarević was one of the most important Serb heroes of Albanian poetry, besides Marko Miljanov and Radomir Vešović.

Lazarević was commander of Montenegrin Royal Gendarmerie which was part of Čakor Detachment during the Battle of Mojkovac. According to some Albanian newspapers, Gendarmerie under Lazarević's command killed Isa Boletini in January 1916.

World War II 
According to pro-Chetnik sources, Lazarević supported Chetniks during the World War II. During short-lived communist rule in Montenegro in 1941, Lazarević resisted to communists in his kulla in Lipovo with several of his relatives. The Chetnik leader Draža Mihailović stayed in Lipovo from mid-1942 to the beginning of 1943.

The house of Lazarević was perfect choice of Chetnik headquarter because it was situated on a hill which dominated whole of its surrounding. According to report of the Commander of Communist Durmitor Detachment, Partisans attacked Gornje Lipovo and performed cleansing operation which included the house of Savo Lazarević. The communists had an order to establish their own headquarter in the house of Savo Lazarević.

The communist forces tried to kill him because they concluded he was "irreversible reactionary and enemy of People's Liberation War". Their first attempt in March 1942 was not successful. They succeeded in June 1943.

Savo Lazarević was 93 when, together with his brother Vučeta and Gligorije Puletić from Gornje Lipovo, defended his house from the attacking communist forces. They resisted three days to attacking communist forces and killed 5 Partisans. When they spent all their ammunition, they committed suicide with hand grenades.

References

Sources 

 
 
 
 
 
 
 

1849 births
1943 deaths
Montenegrin military personnel of World War I